Irène de Lipkowski (3 December 1898 – 16 August 1995) was a French politician who served as a member of the National Assembly from 1951 to 1955, and as the 8th President of the International Alliance of Women from 1973 to 1979.

References

1898 births
1995 deaths
People from Cher (department)
Politicians from Centre-Val de Loire
Rally of the French People politicians
Democratic Union of Labour politicians
International Alliance of Women people
Deputies of the 2nd National Assembly of the French Fourth Republic
Women members of the National Assembly (France)
20th-century French women